Isabella Moore is a New Zealand soprano singer.

Life
Moore is of Samoan heritage and was born in New Zealand. She has a Bachelor of Music and Postgraduate Diploma in Voice Performance from the New Zealand School of Music. Under the tutelage of Dennis O’Neill and Nuccia Focile she has studied Advanced Vocal Performance at the Wales International Academy of Voice. To support her studies with Dennis O’Neill, Moore won the Dame Malvina Major Foundation Arts Excellence Award (Wellington region).

Awards 
In 2012 she won the Iosefa Enari Memorial Award at the Creative New Zealand Arts Pasifika Awards.

In 2014 she won the Lexus Song Quest and in 2012 awards she was a semi-finalist and won the Radio New Zealand listeners' choice award.

In 2014 she won the IFAC Australian Singing Competition and the Marianne Mathy Scholarship.

In 2017 she was selected by the Houston Grand Opera as a semifinalist in the 29th Eleanor McCollum Competition for Young Singers Concert of Arias. In the summer of the same year, she attended the Music Academy of the West conservatory program.

References

External links 
 
 

Living people
New Zealand people of Samoan descent
New Zealand operatic sopranos
New Zealand School of Music alumni
Year of birth missing (living people)
Music Academy of the West alumni